Tung Wah College (TWC) is a self-financing degree granting tertiary institution of Hong Kong, established by the Tung Wah Group of Hospitals (TWGHs) in 2010 and registered under the Post-Secondary Colleges Ordinance (Cap 320).

With a mission to providing quality tertiary education to nurture talents (particularly healthcare professionals) with caring attitude and a sense of social responsibility for the benefits of society, TWC is paving way to become a private university.

With the support of TWGHs, TWC has been developing rapidly and built up a niche in healthcare education. Currently, it is one of the self-financing tertiary institutions training the largest number of registered and enrolled nurses in Hong Kong. It is also the first self-financing tertiary institute offering professionally accredited degrees to train allied health professionals such as medical laboratory technologists, occupational therapists and radiation therapists. Besides, the college is the first institution registered under the Post Secondary Colleges Ordinance offering early childhood education degree and higher diploma programmes to train qualified kindergarten teachers and child care professionals.

TWC has 4 schools (namely School of Arts and Humanities, School of Management, School of Medical Health Sciences, and School of Nursing) offering a total of 16 degree, sub-degree, diploma and certificate programmes. It has a student population of over 3,000.

History 
2010
  The beginning of the year, the Board of Directors of the TWGHs formally established 'Tung Wah Tertiary Institute'.[4]

2011
 The institute was renamed the Tung Wah College in April.
 In May, the college was accredited by Hong Kong Council for Accreditation of Academic and Vocational Qualifications and recognised by the Education Bureau.
 In September, Bachelor of Business Administration (Honours) was launched.

2012
 The college started to offer the Bachelor of Health Sciences (Honours) (majoring in nursing), Bachelor of Social Sciences (Honours) (majoring in psychology), Associate of Health Studies and Associate of Social Science.

2013
 The college started to offer Bachelor of Medical Health Sciences (Honours) (majoring in basic medical science, forensic science, medical laboratory science and radiation therapy)

2014
 The Education Bureau announced that the Bachelor of Health Science (Honours) in Nursing would be included in the Study Subsidy Scheme for Designated Professions/Sectors (SSSDP) funded by the Government starting from the 2015/2016 academic year.

2015
  A new academic structure with the establishment of 4 schools (namely Arts and Humanities, Business, Medical and Health Sciences, and Nursing) was implemented to facilitate the college's development into a private university.

2016
 The programmes of Bachelor of Science (Honours) in Medical Laboratory Science and Bachelor of Science (Honours) in Radiation Therapy were recognised respectively by the Medical Laboratory Technologists Board and the Radiographers Board under the Supplementary Medical Professions Council. The college became the first self-financing institution to offer professionally accredited medical laboratory science and radiation therapy programmes. The Education Bureau announced that the two programmes would be included in the Study Subsidy Scheme for Designated Professions/Sectors (SSSDP) funded by the Government starting from 2017/2018 academic year.

2017
 Bachelor of Science (Honours) in Occupational Therapy was recognised by the Occupational Therapists Board under the Supplementary Medical Professions Council. The college became the first self-financing institution to offer professionally accredited occupational therapy programme. The Education Bureau announced that the programme would be included in the SSSDP funded by the Government starting from 2018/2019 academic year.
 Bachelor of Education (Honours) in Early Childhood Education was launched. The college became the first self-financing institution registered under the Post Secondary Colleges Ordinance (Cap. 320) to offer accredited early childhood education degree programme.

2018
 Bachelor of Science (Honours) in Physiotherapy was launched. The college became the first self-financing institution registered under the Post Secondary Colleges Ordinance (Cap. 320) to offer such degree programme. The Education Bureau announced that the programme would be included in the SSSDP funded by the Government starting from 2019/2020 academic year.

2019
 Bachelor of Management (Honours) in Social and Business Sustainability was launched. The college became the first self-financing institution to offer such degree programme.
2020
 Prof. Yu-hon Lui concluded his tenure as the President of TWC in March. The Vice President (Academic), Prof. Lawrence Lam and the Acting Vice President (Administration & Development), Mr. Patrick Ho, served as the Acting Presidents of the college until the arrival of the new president.
TWC acquired the first programme area accreditation status for the programme area of Occupational Therapy at QF Level 5, marking its first and significant step to become a private university.
2021
 The Board of Governors of Tung Wah College appointed Professor Sally Chan as the third President.

Programmes offered
The college currently offers the following programmes:

Arts and humanities 
 Bachelor of Education (Honours) in Early Childhood Education * (4-year)
 Bachelor of Social Sciences (Honours) in Applied Psychology * (4-year)
 Higher Diploma in Psychology (2-year)
 Higher Diploma in Early Childhood Education (2-year)

Management 
 Bachelor of Management (Honours) in Social and Business Sustainability * (4-year)
 Bachelor of Health Information and Services Management (Honours) * (4-year)

Medical and health sciences 
 Bachelor of Medical Science (Honours) * (4-year)
 Major in Basic Medical Sciences
Major in Forensic Science
 Bachelor of Science (Honours) in Medical Laboratory Science (4-year)
 Bachelor of Science (Honours) in Radiation Therapy * (4-year)
 Bachelor of Science (Honours) in Occupational Therapy (4-year)
 Bachelor of Science (Honours) in Physiotheraphy (4-year)
 Higher Diploma in Health Science (2-year)
Advanced Certificate in Occupational Therapy (Applied Geriatrics) (12 months part-time)
Advanced Certificate in Occupational Therapy (Applied Paediatrics) (12 months part-time)

Nursing 
 Bachelor of Health Science (Honours) in Nursing * (5-year)
 Bachelor of Science (Honours) in Applied Gerontology * (4-year)
 Higher Diploma in Nursing (2-year)
 Diploma in Health Studies (2-year)
Certificate in Endoscopy Care (5 months part-time)
* Senior Year Entry is available

Campuses 
 King's Park Campus: Ma Kam Chan Memorial Building, 31 Wylie Road, Ho Man Tin, Hong Kong
 Mongkok Campus: Cheung Kung Hai Memorial Building, 90A, and Cheung Chin Lan Hong Building, 98, Shantung Street, Mong Kok, Hong Kong
 Kwai Hing Campus: 16/F, Tower 2, Kowloon Commerce Centre, 51 Kwai Cheong Road, Kwai Chung, Hong Kong

References
1. Jump up^ The official website of Tung Wah Group of Hospitals

2. Jump up to:a b Tung Wah College, Information Portal for Accredited Post-secondary Programmes, 2008

2010 establishments in Hong Kong
Educational institutions established in 2010
Universities and colleges in Hong Kong
King's Park, Hong Kong